Saidpur is a town and a nagar panchayat in the Badaun district of the Indian state of Uttar Pradesh.

Geography and climate 

As with other areas in the North Indian plains, Saidpur has three seasons: winter, summer and spring, with most rainfall occurring in spring. The low temperatures in winter are below .

Demographics 

As of the 2001 India census, Saidpur had a population of 13,717. Males constituted 52% of the population and females 48%. Saidpur had an average literacy rate of 40%, lower than the national average of 59.5%. Male literacy was 46% and female literacy was 34%. 18% of the population is under six years of age. According to some estimates, 90% of the population is Muslim and 10% is Hindu.

Culture 

The large Muslim population celebrates Islamic festivals, especially Eid-ul Adha and Eid-ul Fitr. The people celebrate Ramadan, Eid al Adha and Eid al Fitr. There are fourteen mosques and one temple in Saidpur. Saidpur has an old horse fair (Numaaish named Agha Sahab Wala Purana Kissan Mela organised by people of Khanchi thrice in a year. People come from every part of India for business of horse.

Aldermanry 

1-Mohalla Khanchi

2-Noori Chowk (Quresiyan Mohalla) 

3-Khawaja Chowk

4-Azhari Chowk (Masjid Ameer khan)  

5-Kheda Shadat (Sadat Chowk)

6-Mohalla Pachim

7-Girdarpur (Mohalla purab)

8-Kaoaa Tola (Jama Masjid)

9-Darji Chowk (bajariya)

10-Raza Nagar (Mirzapur)

11-Dullan Nagri

12-Mohalla Qazi

13-Mohalla Jhanda

14-Gaus Nagar (Nai Basti)

15-Bada Takiya Ashraf nagar

References 

Cities and towns in Budaun district